Maria Bakodimou (Μαρία Μπακοδήμου) (b. 1965) is a Greek television personality,talk show presenter and fashion designer. She co-hosted the National Final to select the Greek representative in the Eurovision Song Contest 2007. She had her own talk show with Fotis Sergoulopoulos in TV, which was called "Fotis & Maria Live".

Her cousin is the Greek-French journalist and entertainer Nikos Aliagas.

From 2017, Maria was selected to be one of the judges of Ellada Eheis Talento alongside Giorgos Kapoutzidis and Sakis Tanimanidis.

From 2018 she presents the dating reality show of Skai TV 'Power of Love'.

Filmography

Film

Television

External links

References

1965 births
Greek television presenters
Living people
Greek women television presenters
Greek fashion designers
Greek women fashion designers
People from Missolonghi
Mass media people from Athens